These are the career statistics for Canadian tennis player Félix Auger-Aliassime. All information is according to the ATP.

Performance timelines

Singles
Current through the 2023 Indian Wells.

Doubles

Significant finals

Masters 1000 finals

Doubles: 1 (1 title)

ATP career finals

Singles: 13 (4 titles, 9 runner-ups)

Doubles: 2 (1 title, 1 runner-up)

National and international representation

Team competitions finals: 5 (3 titles, 2 runner-ups)

ATP Challenger Tour and ITF Futures finals

Singles: 9 (6 titles, 3 runner-ups)

Doubles: 2 (2 titles)

Junior Grand Slam finals

Singles: 2 (1 title, 1 runner-up)

Doubles: 3 (1 title, 2 runner-ups)

Career Grand Slam tournament statistics

Career Grand Slam tournament seedings

*

Best Grand Slam results details

Head-to-head records

Record against top 10 players
Auger-Aliassime's record against players who have been ranked in the top 10, with those who are active in boldface. Only ATP Tour main draw matches are considered:

Record against players ranked No. 11–20

Active players are in boldface. 

 Nikoloz Basilashvili 3–0
 Frances Tiafoe 3–0
 Pablo Cuevas 2–0
 Alex de Minaur 2–0
 Nick Kyrgios 2–0
 Albert Ramos Viñolas 2–1
 Cristian Garín 2–2
 Chung Hyeon 1–0
 Reilly Opelka 1–0
 Sam Querrey 1–0
 Andreas Seppi 1–1
 Borna Ćorić 1–2
 Kyle Edmund 0–1
 Aslan Karatsev 0–1
 Ivo Karlović 0–1
 Feliciano López 0–1
 Benoît Paire 0–1
 Bernard Tomic 0–1

*

Wins over top-10 players
Auger-Aliassime has a  record against players who were ranked in the top 10 at the time the match was played.

* .

See also
Canada Davis Cup team
List of Canada Davis Cup team representatives

Notable exhibitions

Singles

References

External links
 
 Félix Auger-Aliassime at the ITF profile
 

Auger-Aliassime, Félix